Bartnicki is a surname. Notable people with the surname include:

 Bartłomiej Bartnicki (born 1981), Polish wrestler
 Krzysztof Bartnicki (born 1971), Polish translator, writer, musician, and composer

See also
 Bartnicki v. Vopper, United States Supreme Court case

Polish-language surnames